Ilona Breģe (born 20 May 1959 in Riga, Soviet Union) is a composer, pianist and musicologist. She graduated the Latvian Music Academy (former State Conservatory) as pianist (1983) and composer (1986), Doctor of Art (1993).

Breģe was solo pianist in the Latvian Philharmonic (1983–92), researcher in the Latvian Science Academy in the Literature, Folklore and Art department (1992–98), General Manager of the Latvian National Symphony Orchestra (1997–2006). As of 2006, she is the Managing Director of the Riga Professional Symphonic Band.

Selected compositions
2008 Concert for Violin and Chamber Orchestra, dedicated to Baiba Skride. First performance 17 January 2009, Great Guild Concert Hall in Riga. Soloist Baiba Skride, chamber orchestra "Sinfonietta Riga", conductor Normunds Sne. 20 minutes
2007 Otrais Rīgas koncerts (Riga Concerto No. 2) for violin, viola and chamber orchestra. First performance 17 February 2008, Latvian Music Academy Concert Hall. Soloists Darja Smirnova, Arigo Strals, orchestra "Sinfonia Concertante", conductore Andris Vecumnieks. 17 minutes
2007 Simple Seasons, cycle for string orchestra. 9 minutes
2006 Riga Concerto No. 1 for Two Violins, Violoncello, String Orchestra and Percussion. First Performance 29 June 2006, Kremerata Festival in Sigulda, Latvia. Soloists Sandis Steinberts, Ruta Lipinaitite, Eriks Kirsfelds, chamber orchestra "Kremerata Baltica". 16 minutes
2006 Symphony No. 2. First Performance 12 December 2006, Latvian National Opera. Latvian National Symphony Orchestra, conductor Normunds Vaicis. 22 minutes
2004 Symphony No. 1. First Performance 27 April 2004, Great Guild Concert Hall in Riga. Latvian National Symphony Orchestra, conductor Andris Nelsons. 21 minutes
2001 Symphonic Epiloque. 8 minutes
1998 Concerto No. 2 for Piano and Symphony Orchestra. 18 minutes
1988 Living Water, chamber opera based on the play by Mara Zalite. 90 minutes
1987 Preconcert Music for Two Pianos. 10 minutes
1986 Concerto for Marimba and String Orchestra. 13 minutes
1985 Sonata for Piano. 8 minutes
1984 Concerto for Piano and Strings. 17 minutes
1984 Divi liriski intermeco (2 Lyrical Intermezzos) for viola and piano

Publications 
Teātris senajā Rīgā – vēstures fakti, vācu kultūra un skats pāri diviem gadsimtiem (Theatre in Old Riga – Historical Facts, German Culture, and an Overview of Two Centuries). – Riga: Zinātne, 1997, 228 pages;
Cittautu mūziķi Latvijā 1401–1939 (Foreign Musicians in Latvia 1401–1939) [Lexicon]. – Riga: Zinātne, 2001, 232 pages.

External links 
Ilona Breģe
Musica Baltica
Sinfonietta Riga
Riga Professional Symphonic Band

1959 births
Living people
Musicians from Riga
Latvian composers
Women composers